Hassan Arsmouk (Berber: ⵃⴰⵙⴰⵏ ⴰⵔⵙⵎⵓⴽ, Arabic: حسن أرسموك; born in 1963) is a Moroccan Amazigh singer who was born in a small Chleuh tribe in Tiznit Province.

Biography 
Hassan Arsmouk was born in 1963 in the small tribe of Irsmouken in Anzi, a rural commune in the south of Morocco. Thus, his name Arsmouk meaning from Irsmouken in Shilha. His real name is Hassan Bouzman.

His singing career started early when he was young and became increasingly popular starting from the 1990s.  His musical band formed several other singers and artists such as Raïs El Houcine Amarrakchi, Raïssa Aïcha Tachinouit, Raïs Saïd Outajajt, Raïssa Mina Tabaamrant, Raïssa Mina Taouirirte.

Discography 
Hassan Arsmouk is one of the most prolific modern Amazigh singers with more than 120 recorded songs in more than 18 albums.

Concerts 
Hassan Arsmouk has many concerts mostly local wedding ceremonies as well as national and international festivals such as Mawazine.

References 

1963 births
21st-century Moroccan male singers
Berber Moroccans
Berber musicians
Shilha people
Living people
20th-century Moroccan male singers